HMCS Festubert was one of twelve  naval trawlers constructed for and used by the Royal Canadian Navy (RCN) during the First World War. Following the war, Festubert remained in Canadian service as a training ship until 1934. Reactivated for the Second World War, the ship was used as a gate vessel in the defence of Halifax, Nova Scotia and re-designated Gate Vessel 17. Following the war, the trawler was sold for commercial use and renamed Inverleigh. Inverleigh was scuttled off Burgeo, Newfoundland on 30 June 1971.

Design and description
The RCN's Battle-class trawlers formed part of the Canadian naval response to Admiralty warnings to Canada about the growing German U-boat threat to merchant shipping in the western Atlantic. Intended to augment anti-submarine patrols off Canada's east coast, these ships were modelled on contemporary British North Sea trawlers, since the standard types of Canadian fishing vessels were considered unsuitable for patrol work.

Twelve vessels were ordered on 2 February 1917 from two shipyards, Polson Iron Works of Toronto and Canadian Vickers of Montreal.

All twelve trawlers were equipped with a QF 12-pounder 12 cwt naval gun mounted forward. This was considered to be the smallest gun that stood a chance of putting a surfaced U-boat out of action, and they also carried a small number of depth charges. The trawlers were named after battles of the Western Front during the First World War that Canadians had been involved in. They cost between $155,000 and $160,000 per vessel.

Service history
Built by Polson Iron Works at Toronto, Festubert, named for the Battle of Festubert, was launched on 2 August 1917. Intended for use during the 1917 shipping season, the construction of the vessels was delayed by the entry of the United States into the war. With higher wages found south of the border, a shortage of skilled labour developed in the shipyards, coupled with a shortage of construction material. The trawler was commissioned on 13 November 1917. Festubert sailed to Halifax following her commissioning for defence of the Atlantic coast of Canada. For the defence of shipping in Canadian waters in 1918, the entire Battle class was assigned to work out of Sydney, Nova Scotia. Following the sinking of the merchant vessel Luz Blanca off Halifax, Festubert was among the vessels tasked with hunting for the German submarine , which had been operating off the coast of Nova Scotia.

The ship remained in Canadian service following the end of the war until being paid off in 1920. After being recommissioned on 1 May 1923 as a training ship on the east coast, having been re-designated a minesweeper in 1922. With sister ship , Festubert trained with the destroyers on the east coast until 1934 she was again paid off and was placed in reserve. Festubert was reactivated in 1939 for service as a gate vessel at Halifax. Re-designated Gate Vessel 17 in September, the ship collected five survivors after Ypres was rammed and sunk by the British battleship  on 12 May 1940. The ship was sold for commercial service in 1946, emerging as Inverleigh in 1947. On 30 June 1971 Inverleigh was scuttled off Burgeo, Newfoundland.

References

Notes

Citations

Sources

External links
 Battle-class trawlers

 

Battle-class trawlers
World War I naval ships of Canada
1917 ships
Auxiliary ships of the Royal Canadian Navy